Attacus lorquinii is a moth in the family Saturniidae. It is found in the Philippines.

Subspecies

Attacus lorquinii banghaasi Gschwandner, 1920
Attacus lorquinii calayanensis Brechlin & van Schayck, 2016
Attacus lorquinii lorquinii C. & R. Felder, 1861

References

Saturniidae
Moths described in 1861
Moths of the Philippines